During the 1991–92 English football season, Brighton & Hove Albion F.C. competed in the Football League Second Division.

Season summary
In the 1991–92 season, Brighton again sold their best players Mike Small and John Byrne, and lost the experienced Steve Gatting in defence. At least this time, the players were sold for a decent price, West Ham United paying £400,000 for Small and Sunderland laying out £235,000 for Byrne. Crowds fell again and the team plummeted for the second time they had sold all their best players and were relegated from Division Two to the New Division Two (after the formation of the Premier League). In the FA Cup Third Round, a capacity crowd of 18,031 against non-leaguers Crawley Town saw Brighton win 5–0 in what was a local derby. The dissatisfied fans formed the Brighton Independent Supporters Association and staged protests.

Final league table

Results
Brighton & Hove Albion's score comes first

Legend

Football League Second Division

FA Cup

League Cup

Full Members Cup

Squad

References

Brighton & Hove Albion F.C. seasons
Brighton and Hove Albion